Michael Taylor (born 21 September 1944) became notable in England in 1974 as a result of the Ossett murder case and his alleged demonic possession.

Exorcism
Taylor lived in Ossett, West Yorkshire, working as a butcher. In 1974, Taylor's wife, Christine, stated to a Christian Fellowship Group to which Taylor belonged, that his relationship with the lay leader of the group, Marie Robinson, was "carnal" in nature. Michael Taylor admitted that he felt evil within him and eventually attacked Robinson verbally, who screamed back at him. During the next meeting, Michael Taylor received an absolution, but nevertheless, his behaviour continued to become more erratic. As a result, the local vicar called in other ministers experienced in deliverance in preparation to cast out the demons residing within the man.

The exorcism, which occurred on 5–6 October 1974 at St. Thomas's Church in Gawber, was headed by Father Peter Vincent, the Anglican priest of St. Thomas's, and was aided by a Methodist clergyman, the Rev. Raymond Smith. According to Bill Ellis, an authority on folklore and the occult in contemporary culture, the exorcists believed that they had: "In an all-night ceremony...invoked and cast out at least forty demons, including those of incest, bestiality, blasphemy, and lewdness. At the end, exhausted, they allowed Taylor to go home, although they felt that at least three demons—insanity, murder, and violence—were still left in him."

Murder 
While at home, Taylor brutally murdered his wife, Christine. He attacked her with his bare hands, tearing her eyes and tongue out and almost tearing her face off, then strangling their poodle. He was found by a policeman, naked in the street, covered with blood.

At his trial in March, Taylor was acquitted on the grounds of insanity. He was sent to Broadmoor Hospital for two years, then spent another two years in a secure ward in Bradford before being released. The bizarre nature of the case attracted significant publicity.

In popular culture
Taylor's case makes a prominent appearance in David Peace's novel Nineteen Seventy-Seven, the second of Peace's Red Riding Quartet. Taylor, renamed Michael Williams, is exorcised by Father Martin Laws, the series' main villain, and afterward kills his wife Carol by driving a nail into her skull. Jack Whitehead, one of the two protagonists, witnesses the exorcism of Williams and the murder of Carol Williams, his ex-wife, which as in real life takes place in Ossett.

Taylor's case is mentioned in the 2021 film The Conjuring: The Devil Made Me Do It, which is based on another case in which a killer claimed demonic possession, that of Arne Cheyenne Johnson, who killed his landlord with a pocket knife in a fit of rage in 1981.

See also
 Trial of Arne Cheyenne Johnson
 Anneliese Michel
 Clara Germana Cele
 David Berkowitz
 Exorcism of Roland Doe
 Johann Blumhardt

References

External links
St. Petersburg Times: Exorcism approval rocks Anglicans

1940s births
1974 murders in the United Kingdom
English butchers
Exorcised people
People acquitted of murder
People acquitted by reason of insanity
People from Ossett
Living people
Uxoricides
Year of birth missing (living people)
Demonic possession